Mide is a village in the municipality of Ulcinj, Montenegro.

Demographics
According to the 2011 census, its population was 234, all but 3 of them Albanians.

References

Populated places in Ulcinj Municipality
Albanian communities in Montenegro